Polycles, an ancient Greek name, may refer to:

 Polycles (370 BC), sculptor, flourished about the 102nd Olympiad (370 BCE), mentioned in Pliny's Natural History
 Polycles of Sparta, Olympic winner in 440 BC
 Polycles of Cyrene, Olympic winner in 348 BC
 Polycles (155 BC), sculptor flourished about the 156th Olympiad (155 BCE), mentioned in Pliny's Natural History
 Against Polycles, judicial oration by Pseudo-Demosthenes (384–322 BCE)